Dorothy Ashby is a self-titled album by jazz harpist Dorothy Ashby, released on the Argo label in 1962.

Reception

AllMusic rated the album 3 stars.

Track listing 
All compositions by Dorothy Ashby except as indicated
 "Lonely Melody" (Ollie McLaughlin) - 3:45   
 "Secret Love" (Sammy Fain, Paul Francis Webster) - 3:32   
 "Gloomy Sunday" (Rezső Seress, László Jávor, Sam M. Lewis) - 2:34   
 "Satin Doll" (Duke Ellington) - 5:08   
 "John R." - 3:15   
 "Li'l Darlin'" (Neal Hefti) - 4:29   
 "Booze" - 2:15   
 "Django" (John Lewis) - 4:30   
 "You Stepped Out of a Dream" (Nacio Herb Brown, Gus Kahn) - 3:25   
 "Stranger in Paradise" (Robert Wright, George Forrest) - 3:14

Personnel 
Dorothy Ashby - harp
Herman Wright - bass
John Tooley - drums

References

External links
A Dorothy Ashby Discography

Dorothy Ashby albums
1962 albums
Argo Records albums